Ann Hart Coulter (born December 8, 1961) is an American conservative media pundit, author, syndicated columnist, and lawyer. She became known as a media pundit in the late 1990s, appearing in print and on cable news as an outspoken critic of the Clinton administration. Her first book concerned the impeachment of Bill Clinton and sprang from her experience writing legal briefs for Paula Jones's attorneys, as well as columns she wrote about the cases. Coulter's syndicated column for Universal Press Syndicate appears in newspapers and is featured on conservative websites. Coulter has also written 13 books.

Early life

Ann Hart Coulter was born on December 8, 1961, in New York City, to John Vincent Coulter (1926–2008), an FBI agent from a working class Catholic Irish American and German American family in Albany, New York, and Nell Husbands Coulter (née Martin; 1928–2009), who was born in Paducah, Kentucky.

Coulter's mother's ancestry has been traced back on both sides of her family to a group of Puritan settlers in Plymouth Colony, British America arriving on the Griffin with Thomas Hooker in 1633, and her father's family were Catholic Irish and German immigrants who arrived in America in the 19th century. Her father's Irish ancestors emigrated during the famine—and became ship laborers, tilemakers, brickmakers, carpenters and flagmen. Coulter's father attended college on the GI Bill, and would later idolize Joseph McCarthy.

She has two older brothers: James, an accountant, and John, an attorney. Her family later moved to New Canaan, Connecticut, where Coulter and her two older brothers, James and John, were raised. Coulter graduated from New Canaan High School in 1980.

While attending Cornell University, Coulter helped found The Cornell Review, and was a member of the Delta Gamma national sorority. She graduated cum laude from Cornell in 1984 with a Bachelor of Arts degree in history and received her Juris Doctor from the University of Michigan Law School in 1988, where she was an editor of the Michigan Law Review. At Michigan, Coulter was president of the local chapter of the Federalist Society and was trained at the National Journalism Center.

Coulter's age was disputed in 2002. While she argued that she was not yet 40, The Washington Post columnist Lloyd Grove cited a birthdate of December 8, 1961, which Coulter provided when registering to vote in New Canaan, Connecticut, prior to the 1980 Presidential election, for which she had to be 18 years old to register. A driver's license issued several years later purportedly listed her birthdate as December 8, 1963. Coulter will not confirm either date, citing privacy concerns.

Career
After law school, Coulter served as a law clerk, in Kansas City, for Judge Pasco Bowman II of the United States Court of Appeals for the Eighth Circuit. After a short time working in New York City in private practice, where she specialized in corporate law, Coulter left to work for the United States Senate Judiciary Committee after the Republican Party took control of Congress in 1994. She handled crime and immigration issues for Senator Spencer Abraham of Michigan and helped craft legislation designed to expedite the deportation of aliens convicted of felonies. She later became a litigator with the Center for Individual Rights.

Coulter has written 13 books, and also publishes a syndicated newspaper column. She is particularly known for her polemical style, and describes herself as someone who likes to "stir up the pot. I don't pretend to be impartial or balanced, as broadcasters do".
She idolized Clare Boothe Luce for her satirical style. She also makes numerous public appearances, speaking on television and radio talk shows, as well as on college campuses, receiving both praise and protest. Coulter typically spends 6 to 12 weeks of the year on speaking engagement tours, and more when she has a book coming out.
In 2010, she made an estimated $500,000 on the speaking circuit, giving speeches on topics of modern conservatism, gay marriage, and what she describes as the hypocrisy of modern American liberalism. During one appearance at the University of Arizona, a pie was thrown at her. In defense of her ideas, Coulter has on occasion responded with inflammatory remarks toward hecklers and protestors who attend her speeches.

Books

Coulter is the author of twelve books, including many that have appeared on The New York Times Best Seller list, with a combined 3 million copies sold .

Coulter's first book, High Crimes and Misdemeanors: The Case Against Bill Clinton, was published by Regnery Publishing in 1998 and made The New York Times Bestseller list. It details Coulter's case for the impeachment of President Bill Clinton.

Her second book, Slander: Liberal Lies About the American Right, published by Crown Forum in 2002, reached the number one spot on The New York Times non-fiction best seller list. In Slander, Coulter argues that President George W. Bush was given unfair negative media coverage. The factual accuracy of Slander was called into question by then-comedian and author, later Democratic U.S. Senator from Minnesota, Al Franken; he also accused her of citing passages out of context. Others investigated these charges, and also raised questions about the book's accuracy and presentation of facts. Coulter responded to criticisms in a column called "Answering My Critics".

In her third book, Treason: Liberal Treachery from the Cold War to the War on Terrorism, also published by Crown Forum, she reexamines the 60-year history of the Cold War—including the career of Senator Joseph McCarthy, the Whittaker Chambers-Alger Hiss affair, and Ronald Reagan's challenge to Mikhail Gorbachev to "tear down this wall"—and argues that liberals were wrong in their Cold War political analyses and policy decisions, and that McCarthy was correct about Soviet agents working for the U.S. government.
She also argues that the correct identification of Annie Lee Moss, among others, as communists was misreported by the liberal media.
Treason was published in 2003, and spent 13 weeks on the Best Seller list.

Crown Forum published a collection of Coulter's columns in 2004 as her fourth book, How to Talk to a Liberal (If You Must): The World According to Ann Coulter.

Coulter's fifth book, published by Crown Forum in 2006, is Godless: The Church of Liberalism.
In it, she argues, first, that American liberalism rejects the idea of God and reviles people of faith, and second, that it bears all the attributes of a religion itself.
Godless debuted at number one on the New York Times Best Seller list. Some passages in the book match portions of others' writings published at an earlier time (including newspaper articles and a Planned Parenthood document), leading John Barrie of iThenticate to assert that Coulter had engaged in "textbook plagiarism".

Coulter's If Democrats Had Any Brains, They'd Be Republicans (Crown Forum), published in October 2007, and Guilty: Liberal "Victims" and Their Assault on America (Crown Forum), published on January 6, 2009, both also achieved best-seller status.

On June 7, 2011, Crown Forum published her eighth book Demonic: How the Liberal Mob Is Endangering America.

Her ninth book, published September 25, 2012, was Mugged: Racial Demagoguery from the Seventies to Obama. It argues that liberals, and Democrats in particular, have taken undue credit for racial civil rights in America.

Coulter's tenth book, Never Trust a Liberal Over 3 – Especially a Republican, was released October 14, 2013. It is her second collection of columns and her first published by Regnery since her first book, High Crimes and Misdemeanors. Coulter published her eleventh book, Adios, America: The Left's Plan to Turn Our Country Into a Third World Hellhole on June 1, 2015. The book addresses illegal immigration, amnesty programs, and border security in the United States.

Columns
In the late 1990s, Coulter's weekly (biweekly from 1999 to 2000) syndicated column for Universal Press Syndicate began appearing. Her column is featured on six conservative websites: Human Events Online, WorldNetDaily, Townhall.com, VDARE, FrontPage Magazine, Jewish World Review and her own website. Her syndicator says, "Ann's client newspapers stick with her because she has a loyal fan base of conservative readers who look forward to reading her columns in their local newspapers".

In 1999, Coulter worked as a columnist for George magazine. Coulter also wrote weekly columns for the conservative magazine Human Events between 1998 and 2003, with occasional columns thereafter. In her columns, she discussed judicial rulings, constitutional issues, and legal matters affecting Congress and the executive branch.

In 2001, as a contributing editor and syndicated columnist for National Review Online (NRO), Coulter was asked by editors to make changes to a piece written after the September 11 attacks. On the show Politically Incorrect, Coulter accused NRO of censorship and said she was paid $5 per article. NRO dropped her column and terminated her editorship. Editor-at-large of NRO, Jonah Goldberg said: "We did not 'fire' Ann for what she wrote... we ended the relationship because she behaved with a total lack of professionalism, friendship, and loyalty [concerning the editing disagreement]."

In August 2005, the Arizona Daily Star dropped Coulter's syndicated column, citing reader complaints: "Many readers find her shrill, bombastic, and mean-spirited. And those are the words used by readers who identified themselves as conservatives".

In July 2006, some newspapers replaced Coulter's column with those of other conservative columnists following the publication of her fourth book, Godless: The Church of Liberalism. After The Augusta Chronicle dropped her column, newspaper editor Michael Ryan said: "it came to the point where she was the issue rather than what she was writing about." Ryan added that he continued himself "to be an Ann Coulter fan" as "her logic is devastating and her viewpoint is right most of the time."

Television and radio

Coulter made her first national media appearance in 1996 after she was hired by the then-fledgling network MSNBC as a legal correspondent. She later appeared on CNN and Fox News. Coulter went on to make frequent guest appearances on many television and radio talk shows.

Films
Coulter appeared in three films released during 2004. The first was Feeding the Beast, a made-for-television documentary on the "24-Hour News Revolution". The other two films were FahrenHYPE 9/11, a direct-to-video documentary rebuttal of Michael Moore's Fahrenheit 911, and Is It True What They Say About Ann?, a documentary on Coulter containing clips of interviews and speeches. In 2015, Coulter had a cameo as the Vice President in the made-for-TV movie Sharknado 3: Oh Hell No!

Political views 

Coulter is a Presbyterian. She is a conservative columnist and in 2003, described herself as a "typical, immodest-dressing, swarthy male-loving, friend-to-homosexuals, ultra-conservative." She is a registered Republican and former member of the advisory council of GOProud since August 9, 2011.

She supports the display of the Confederate flag. When Milo Yiannopoulos initially defended pederasty, Coulter commented, "Well, Milo learned HIS lesson. Pederasty acceptable only for refugees and illegals. Then libs will support you."

Abortion 
Coulter supported the overturning of Roe v. Wade. She is anti-abortion but believes there should be an exception if a woman is raped. However, in 2015, she prioritized the issue of immigration, stating: "I don't care if [Trump] wants to perform abortions in the White House after this immigration policy paper".

Christianity 
Coulter was raised by a Catholic father and Protestant mother. At one public lecture she said: "I don't care about anything else; Christ died for my sins, and nothing else matters." She summarized her view of Christianity in a 2004 column, saying, "Jesus' distinctive message was: People are sinful and need to be redeemed, and this is your lucky day, because I'm here to redeem you even though you don't deserve it, and I have to get the crap kicked out of me to do it." She then mocked "the message of Jesus... according to liberals", summarizing it as "something along the lines of 'be nice to people, which, in turn, she said "is, in fact, one of the incidental tenets of Christianity."

Confronting some critics' views that her content and style of writing is unchristian, Coulter said that she is "a Christian first and a mean-spirited, bigoted conservative second, and don't you ever forget it." Six years later, in 2011, she also said: "Christianity fuels everything I write. Being a Christian means that I am called upon to do battle against lies, injustice, cruelty, hypocrisy—you know, all the virtues in the church of liberalism". In Godless: The Church of Liberalism, Coulter characterized the theory of evolution as bogus science, and contrasted her beliefs to what she called the left's "obsession with Darwinism and the Darwinian view of the world, which replaces sanctification of life with sanctification of sex and death". Coulter advocates intelligent design, a pseudoscientific antievolution ideology.

Civil liberties 
Coulter endorsed the NSA's Terrorist Surveillance Program directed at Al-Qaeda. During a 2011 appearance on Stossel, she said "PATRIOT Act, fantastic, Gitmo, fantastic, waterboarding, not bad, though torture would've been better." She criticized Rand Paul for "this anti-drone stuff".

Coulter opposes hate crime laws, calling them "unconstitutional". She also stated that "Hate-crime provisions seem vaguely directed at capturing a sense of cold-bloodedness, but the law can do that without elevating some victims over others."

Immigration 
Coulter has criticized former president George W. Bush's immigration proposals, saying they led to "amnesty". In a 2007 column, she claimed that the current immigration system was set up to deliberately reduce the percentage of whites in the population. In it, she said:

Coulter strongly opposes the Immigration and Nationality Act of 1965. Regarding illegal immigration, she strongly opposed amnesty for undocumented immigrants, and at the 2013 CPAC said she has now become "a single-issue voter against amnesty".

In June 2018, during the controversy caused by the Trump administration family separation policy, Coulter dismissed immigrant children as "child actors weeping and crying" and urged Trump not to "fall for it".

Coulter is an advocate of the white genocide conspiracy theory. She has compared non-white immigration into the United States with genocide, and claiming that "a genocide" is occurring against South African farmers, she has said that the Boers are the "only real refugees" in South Africa. Regarding domestic politics, Vox labelled Coulter as one of many providing a voice for "the 'white genocide' myth", and the SPLC covered Coulter's remarks that if the demographic changes occurring in the U.S. were being "legally imposed on any group other than white Americans, it would be called genocide".

LGBT rights  
Coulter opposes same-sex marriage, opposes Obergefell v. Hodges, and supports, after previously saying she did not, a federal U.S. constitutional amendment defining marriage as a union of one man and one woman. She insists that her opposition to same-sex marriage "wasn't an anti-gay thing" and that "It's genuinely a pro-marriage position to oppose gay marriage". Coulter argues that same-sex marriage would "ruin gay culture", because "gays value promiscuous sex over monogamy". In an April 1, 2015, column, Coulter declared that liberals had "won the war on gay marriage (by judicial fiat)".

Coulter also opposes civil unions and privatizing marriage. When addressed with the issue of rights granted by marriage, she said, "Gays already can visit loved ones in hospitals. They can also visit neighbors, random acquaintances, and total strangers in hospitals—just like everyone else. Gays can also pass on property to whomever they would like". She also stated that same-sex sexual intercourse was already protected under the Fourth Amendment, which prevents police from going into your home without a search warrant or court order.

In regard to Romer v. Evans, in which the United Supreme Court overturned Article II, Section 30b of the Colorado Constitution, which prohibited the "State of Colorado, through any of its branches or departments, nor any of its agencies, political subdivisions, municipalities or school districts, shall enact, adopt or enforce any statute, regulation, ordinance or policy whereby homosexual, lesbian or bisexual orientation, conduct, practices or relationships shall constitute or otherwise be the basis of or entitle any person or class of persons to have or claim any minority status, quota preferences, protected status or claim of discrimination.", Coulter described the ruling as "they couldn't refuse to give affirmative action benefits to people who have sodomy". She also disagreed with repealing Don't Ask Don't Tell, stating that it is not an "anti-gay position; it is a pro-military position" because "sexual bonds are disruptive to the military bond". She also stated that there is "no proof that all the discharges for homosexuality involve actual homosexuals." On April 1, 2015, in a column, she expressed support for Indiana's Religious Freedom Restoration Act and said it was an "apocryphal" assertion to claim the Religious Freedom Restoration Act would be used to discriminate against LGBT people. She expressed her support for the Masterpiece Cakeshop v. Colorado Civil Rights Commission ruling.

Coulter has expressed her opposition to treatment of LGBT people in the countries of Cuba, China, and Saudi Arabia. Coulter opposes publicly funded sex reassignment surgery. She supports the Public Facilities Privacy & Security Act and opposes transgender individuals using bathrooms corresponding to their gender identity. She says her opposition to bathroom usage corresponding to gender identity has nothing to do with transgender people, but cisgendered "child molesters" who "now [have] the right to go into that bathroom." She supports banning transgender military service personnel from the United States military.

Since the 1990s, Coulter has had many acquaintances in the LGBT community. She considers herself "the Judy Garland of the Right", reflecting Garland's large fan base from the gay community. In the last few year before 2015 she has attracted LGBT fans, namely gay men and drag queens.

At the 2007 CPAC, Coulter said, "I do want to point out one thing that has been driving me crazy with the media—how they keep describing Mitt Romney's position as being pro-gays, and that's going to upset the right wingers", and "Well, you know, screw you! I'm not anti-gay. We're against gay marriage. I don't want gays to be discriminated against." She added, "I don't know why all gays aren't Republican. I think we have the pro-gay positions, which is anti-crime and for tax cuts. Gays make a lot of money and they're victims of crime. No, they are! They should be with us."

In Coulter's 2007 book If Democrats Had Any Brains, They'd Be Republicans, in the chapter "Gays: No Gay Left Behind!", she argued that Republican policies were more pro-gay than Democratic policies. Coulter attended the 2010 HomoCon of GOProud, where she gave a speech about why gays should oppose same-sex marriage. On February 9, 2011, in a column, she described the national Log Cabin Republicans as "ridiculous" and "not conservative at all". She did, however, describe the Texas branch of Log Cabin Republicans, for whom she has been signing books for years, as " real conservatives".

At the 2011 CPAC, during her question-and-answer segment, Coulter was asked about GOProud and the controversy over their inclusion at the 2011 CPAC. She boasted how she talked GOProud into dropping its support for same-sex marriage in the party's platform, saying, "The left is trying to co-opt gays, and I don't think we should let them. I think they should be on our side", and "Gays are natural conservatives". Later that year, she joined advisory board for GOProud. On Logos The A-List: Dallas she told gay Republican Taylor Garrett that "The gays have got to be pro-life", and "As soon as they find the gay gene, guess who the liberal yuppies are gonna start aborting?"

War on Drugs 
Coulter strongly supports continuing the War on Drugs. However, she has said that, if there were not a welfare state, she "wouldn't care" if drugs were legal. She spoke about drugs as a guest on Piers Morgan Live, where she said that marijuana users "can't perform daily functions".

Bernie Sanders 
In April 2019, Coulter said of Senator Bernie Sanders she would vote and perhaps even work for him in the 2020 U.S. presidential election if he stuck to his "original position" on U.S. border policy. "If he went back to his original position, which is the pro blue-collar position—I mean, it totally makes sense with him," and "If he went back to that position, I'd vote for him, I might work for him. I don't care about the rest of the socialist stuff. Just, can we do something for ordinary Americans?"

Political activities and commentary

Ann Coulter has described herself as a "polemicist" who likes to "stir up the pot" and does not "pretend to be impartial or balanced, as broadcasters do". While her political activities in the past have included advising a plaintiff suing President Bill Clinton as well as considering a run for Congress, she mostly serves as a political pundit, sometimes creating controversy ranging from rowdy uprisings at some of the colleges where she speaks to protracted discussions in the media.

Time magazine's John Cloud once observed that Coulter "likes to shock reporters by wondering aloud whether America might be better off if women lost the right to vote". This was in reference to her statement that "it would be a much better country if women did not vote. That is simply a fact. In fact, in every presidential election since 1950—except Goldwater in '64—the Republican would have won, if only the men had voted." Similarly, in an October 2007 interview with The New York Observer, Coulter said:

Coulter has also appeared on Fox News and advocated for a poll tax and a literacy test for voters (this was in 1999, and she reiterated her support of a literacy test in 2015).

Paula Jones – Bill Clinton case
Coulter first became a public figure shortly before becoming an unpaid legal adviser for the attorneys representing Paula Jones in her sexual harassment suit against President Bill Clinton. Coulter's friend George Conway had been asked to assist Jones' attorneys, and shortly afterward Coulter, who wrote a column about the Paula Jones case for Human Events, was also asked to help, and she began writing legal briefs for the case.

Coulter later stated that she would come to mistrust the motives of Jones' head lawyer, Joseph Cammaratta, who by August or September 1997 was advising Jones that her case was weak and to settle, if a favorable settlement could be negotiated. From the outset, Jones had sought an apology from Clinton at least as eagerly as she sought a settlement. However, in a later interview Coulter recounted that she herself had believed that the case was strong, that Jones was telling the truth, that Clinton should be held publicly accountable for his misconduct, and that a settlement would give the impression that Jones was merely interested in extorting money from the President.

David Daley, who wrote the interview piece for The Hartford Courant recounted what followed:

In his book, Isikoff also reported Coulter as saying: "We were terrified that Jones would settle. It was contrary to our purpose of bringing down the President." After the book came out, Coulter clarified her stated motives, saying:

The case went to court after Jones broke with Coulter and her original legal team, and it was dismissed via summary judgment. The judge ruled that even if her allegations proved true, Jones did not show that she had suffered any damages, stating, "... plaintiff has not demonstrated any tangible job detriment or adverse employment action for her refusal to submit to the governor's alleged advances. The president is therefore entitled to summary judgment on plaintiff's claim of quid pro quo sexual harassment." The ruling was appealed by Jones' lawyers. During the pendency of the appeal, Clinton settled with Jones for $850,000 ($151,000 after legal fees) in November 1998, in exchange for Jones' dismissal of the appeal. By then, the Jones lawsuit had given way to the Monica Lewinsky sex scandal.

In October 2000, Jones revealed that she would pose for nude pictures in an adult magazine, saying she wanted to use the money to pay taxes and support her grade-school-aged children, in particular saying, "I'm wanting to put them through college and maybe set up a college fund." Coulter publicly denounced Jones, calling her "the trailer-park trash they said she was" (Coulter had earlier chastened Clinton supporters for calling Jones this name), after Clinton's former campaign strategist James Carville had made the widely reported remark, "Drag a $100 bill through a trailer park, and you'll never know what you'll find", and called Jones a "fraud, at least to the extent of pretending to be an honorable and moral person".

Coulter wrote:
 Jones claimed not to have been offered any help with a book deal of her own or any other additional financial help after the lawsuit.

2013 CPAC Conference
In March 2013, Coulter was one of the keynote speakers at the Conservative Political Action Conference, where she made references to New Jersey Governor Chris Christie's weight ("CPAC had to cut back on its speakers this year about 300 pounds") and progressive activist Sandra Fluke's hairdo. (Coulter quipped that Fluke didn't need birth control pills because "that haircut is birth control enough".) Coulter advocated against a path to citizenship for undocumented immigrants because such new citizens would never vote for Republican candidates: "If amnesty goes through, America becomes California and no Republican will ever win another election."

VDARE
Since 2013, Coulter has been a contributor to VDARE, a far-right website and blog founded by anti-immigration activist and paleo-conservative Peter Brimelow. Michael Malice has said that "Coulter and VDARE can be considered the furthest edge of the Overton Window" as any political position further to the right would be too heretical to find mainstream success. VDARE is controversial because of its alleged white supremacist rhetoric and support of scientific racism and white nationalism.

Candidate endorsements 
Coulter initially supported George W. Bush's presidency, but later criticized its approach to immigration. She endorsed Duncan Hunter and later Mitt Romney in the 2008 Republican presidential primaries and the 2012 Republican presidential primary and presidential run. In the 2016 Republican Party presidential primaries, she endorsed Donald Trump.  Coulter later distanced herself from Trump following arguments over immigration policies; she called for his impeachment in September 2017, saying "Put a fork in Trump, he's dead". She described herself in 2018 as a "former Trumper"; in a 2020 speech to a Turning Point USA event, she said, "The Trump agenda without Trump would be a lot easier. Our new motto should be 'Going on with Trumpism without Trump.' That's a winning strategy." Coulter blamed Trump's son-in-law and advisor Jared Kushner for Trump's 2020 election loss, and said that Trump had failed to deliver for the white working class.

Other candidates Coulter has endorsed include Greg Brannon (2014 Republican primary candidate for North Carolina Senator), Paul Nehlen (2016 Republican primary candidate for Wisconsin's 1st congressional district in the United States House of Representatives), Mo Brooks (2017 Republican primary candidate for Alabama Senator), and Roy Moore (2017 Republican candidate for Alabama Senator).

Controversies

Comments on Islam, Arabs, and terrorism
Coulter's September 14, 2001, column eulogized her friend Barbara Olson, killed three days earlier in the September 11 attacks, and ended with a call for war:

These comments resulted in Coulter's being fired as a columnist by National Review, which she subsequently referred to as "squeamish girly-boys". Responding to this comment, Ibrahim Hooper of the Council on American–Islamic Relations remarked in the Chicago Sun-Times that before September 11, Coulter "would have faced swift repudiation from her colleagues", but "now it's accepted as legitimate commentary".

One day after the attacks (when death toll estimates were higher than later), Coulter asserted that only Muslims could have been behind them: "Not all Muslims may be terrorists, but all terrorists are Muslims—at least all terrorists capable of assembling a murderous plot against America that leaves 7,000 people dead in under two hours."

Coulter was highly critical in 2002 of the U.S. Department of Transportation and especially its then-secretary Norman Mineta. Her many criticisms include their refusal to use racial profiling as a component of passenger security screening. After a group of Muslims was expelled from a US Airways flight when other passengers expressed concern, sparking a call for Muslims to boycott the airline because of the ejection from a flight of six imams, Coulter wrote, "If only we could get Muslims to boycott all airlines, we could dispense with airport security altogether."

Coulter also cited the 2002 Senate testimony of FBI whistleblower Coleen Rowley, who was acclaimed for condemning her superiors for refusing to authorize a search warrant for 9-11 conspirator Zacarias Moussaoui when he refused to consent to a search of his computer. They knew that he was a Muslim in flight school who had overstayed his visa, and the French Intelligence Service had confirmed his affiliations with radical fundamentalist Islamic groups. Coulter said she agreed that probable cause existed in the case, but that refusing consent, being in flight school and overstaying a visa should not constitute grounds for a search. Citing a poll which found that 98 percent of Muslims between the ages of 20 and 45 said they would not fight for Britain in the war in Afghanistan, and that 48 percent said they would fight for Osama bin Laden she asserted "any Muslim who has attended a mosque in Europe—certainly in England, where Moussaoui lived—has had 'affiliations with radical fundamentalist Islamic groups,'" so that she parsed Rowley's position as meaning that probable cause' existed to search Moussaoui's computer because he was a Muslim who had lived in England". Coulter says the poll was "by The Daily Telegraph", actually it was by Sunrise, an "Asian" (therefore an Indian subcontinent-oriented) radio station, canvassing the opinions of 500 Muslims in Greater London (not Britain as a whole), mainly of Pakistani origin and aged between 20 and 45. Because "FBI headquarters ... refused to engage in racial profiling", they failed to uncover the 9-11 plot, Coulter asserted. "The FBI allowed thousands of Americans to be slaughtered on the altar of political correctness. What more do liberals want?"

Coulter wrote in another column that she had reviewed the civil rights lawsuits against certain airlines to determine which of them had subjected Arabs to the most "egregious discrimination" so that she could fly only that airline. She also said that the airline should be bragging instead of denying any of the charges of discrimination brought against them. In an interview with The Guardian she said, "I think airlines ought to start advertising: 'We have the most civil rights lawsuits brought against us by Arabs.'" When the interviewer, Jonathan Freedland, replied by asking what Muslims would do for travel, she responded, "They could use flying carpets."

In the wake of the Boston Marathon bombing, Coulter told Hannity host Sean Hannity that the wife of bombing suspect Tamerlan Tsarnaev should be jailed for wearing a hijab. Coulter continued by saying "Assimilating immigrants into our culture isn't really working. They're assimilating us into their culture." (Tsarnaev's wife was American-born.)

Anti-semitism accusations 
Coulter was accused of anti-semitism in an October 8, 2007, interview with Donny Deutsch on The Big Idea. During the interview, Coulter stated that the United States is a Christian nation, and said that she wants "Jews to be perfected, as they say" (referring to them being converted to Christianity). Deutsch, a practicing Jew, implied that this was an anti-semitic remark, but Coulter said she did not consider it to be a hateful comment. Coulter's comments on the show were condemned by the Anti-Defamation League, American Jewish Committee and Bradley Burston, and the National Jewish Democratic Council asked media outlets to cease inviting Coulter as a guest commentator. Talk show host Dennis Prager, while disagreeing with her comments, said that they were not "anti-semitic", noting, "There is nothing in what Ann Coulter said to a Jewish interviewer on CNBC that indicates she hates Jews or wishes them ill, or does damage to the Jewish people or the Jewish state. And if none of those criteria is present, how can someone be labeled anti-Semitic?" Conservative activist David Horowitz also defended Coulter against the allegation.

Coulter in September 2015 tweeted in response to multiple candidates' references to Israel during a Republican presidential primary debate, "How many f—ing Jews do these people think there are in the United States?" The Anti-Defamation League referred to the tweets as "ugly, spiteful and anti-Semitic". In response to accusations of anti-Semitism, she tweeted "I like the Jews, I like fetuses, I like Reagan. Didn't need to hear applause lines about them all night."

Plagiarism accusations 
In October 2001, Coulter was accused of plagiarism for her 1998 book High Crimes and Misdemeanors: The Case Against Bill Clinton by Michael Chapman, a columnist for the journal Human Events who claims that passages were taken from a supplement he wrote for the journal in 1997 titled "A Case for Impeachment".

On the July 5, 2006, episode of Countdown with Keith Olbermann on MSNBC, guest John Barrie, the CEO of iParadigms, offered his professional opinion that Coulter plagiarized in her book Godless as well as in her columns over the previous year. Barrie ran "Godless" through iThenticate, his company's machine which is able to scan works and compare them to existing texts.  He found a 25-word section of the text that was "virtually word-for-word" matched with a Planned Parenthood pamphlet and a 33-word section almost duplicating a 1999 article from the Portland Press as some examples of evidence.  Barrie also said that it was "very, very difficult to try to determine whether Ann Coulter was citing that material or whether she was just trying to pass it off".

Left-wing activist group Media Matters for America has appealed to Random House publishing to further investigate Coulter's work. The syndicator of her columns cleared her of the plagiarism charges. Universal Press Syndicate and Crown Books also defended Coulter against the charges.
Columnist Bill Nemitz from the Portland Press Herald accused Coulter of plagiarizing a very specific sentence from his newspaper in her book Godless, but he also acknowledged that one sentence is insufficient grounds for filing suit.

Public perception 
Coulter rejects "the academic convention of euphemism and circumlocution", and is claimed to play to misogyny in order to further her goals; she "dominates without threatening (at least not straight men)". Feminist critics also reject Coulter's opinion that the gains made by women have gone so far as to create an anti-male society and her call for women to be rejected from the military because they are more vicious than men. Like the late anti-feminist Phyllis Schlafly, Coulter uses traditionally masculine rhetoric as reasoning for the need for traditional gender roles, and she carries this idea of feminized dependency into her governmental policies, according to feminist critics.

Coulter was played by Cobie Smulders in Impeachment: American Crime Story; Betty Gilpin was originally cast in the role but dropped out due to scheduling conflicts. The series portrays Coulter's actions while assisting the prosecution in Clinton v. Jones.

Coulter was satirically depicted in season 2, episode 11 of The Boondocks—"The S Word"—where she voiced support for a white teacher in the show who said the N-word.

Personal life 
Coulter has been engaged several times, but she has never married and has no children. She has dated Spin founder and publisher Bob Guccione Jr. and conservative writer Dinesh D'Souza. In October 2007, she began dating Andrew Stein, the former president of the New York City Council, a liberal Democrat. When asked about the relationship, Stein told the New York Post, "She's attacked a lot of my friends, but what can I say, opposites attract!" On January 7, 2008, however, Stein told the New York Post that the relationship was over, citing irreconcilable differences. Kellyanne Conway, who refers to Coulter as a friend, told New York magazine in 2017 that Coulter "started dating her security guard probably ten years ago because she couldn't see anybody else".

Coulter owns a house, bought in 2005, in Palm Beach, Florida, a condominium in Manhattan, and an apartment in Los Angeles. She votes in Palm Beach and is not registered to do so in New York or California.

Bibliography

Notes

References

External links

 
 
 
 In Depth interview with Coulter, August 7, 2011

Column archives
 Ann Coulter column archive for Human Events articles at BNet Find Articles with advanced search (1998–2007)
 Ann Coulter column archive at Human Events (2002–present)(use search feature)
 Ann Coulter column archive at National Review (2000–2001)
 Ann Coulter column archive  at uExpress.com (1999–present) [select headline archive]

Year of birth uncertain
Living people
20th-century American women writers
20th-century American non-fiction writers
20th-century Presbyterians
21st-century American women writers
21st-century American non-fiction writers
21st-century Presbyterians
Right-wing politics in the United States
American women columnists
American critics of Islam
American people of German descent
American people of Irish descent
American political commentators
American political writers
American Presbyterians
American nationalists
American social commentators
California Republicans
Clinton–Lewinsky scandal
Connecticut Republicans
Cornell University alumni
Critics of atheism
Christian critics of Islam
Critics of multiculturalism
Federalist Society members
Female critics of feminism
Florida Republicans
Human Events people
Intelligent design advocates
Lawyers from New York City
National Review people
New York (state) Republicans
People from New Canaan, Connecticut
People from New York City
University of Michigan Law School alumni
Writers from California
Writers from Connecticut
Writers from Florida
Writers from New York City
American women non-fiction writers
1961 births